Anarcha Westcott (c. 1828 – unknown) was an enslaved woman who underwent a series of painful experimental surgical procedures conducted by physician J. Marion Sims, without the use of anesthesia, to treat a combination of vesicovaginal fistula and rectovaginal fistula. Sims's medical experimentation with Anarcha and other enslaved women, and its role in the development of modern gynaecology, has generated controversy among medical historians.

In the 21st century, Anarcha has become a heroine for Black women.

Background  
Little is known about Anarcha; as she was illiterate (by law), most information comes from records kept by her enslavers and Sims' records of his experiments. She first turns up in the autobiography of J. Marion Sims as a "little mulatto girl" living in the doctor's house in Mount Meigs, Alabama; as he says on the following page, "a little negro girl would sleep in the room with me, and hand me a drink of water occasionally."

Anarcha next turns up as "a young colored woman, about seventeen years of age, well developed" belonging to a Mr. Wescott , who lived a mile from Sims' house, at that time in Montgomery, Alabama. Sims was called in to assist after her labor lasted three days. Whereas Anarcha's "colleague" Betsey, on whom Sims would operate for a similar problem, had "married last year", no source comments on how Anarcha became pregnant, so the unidentified father of her stillborn child may well have been Mr. Wescott ("a kind-hearted man") or Dr. Sims.

Experimental surgery 
After the stillbirth, Anarcha was brought back to Sims because she had several unhealed tears in her vagina and rectum – a vesicovaginal fistula and rectovaginal fistula. These tears meant she had no control over her urine and feces, which caused her to have excruciating pain from her uncontrollable bowel and urine movements flowing through her open wounds. Being unable to control her urine and feces led to infections, inflamed tissue, and odor. 

Sims performed 30 experimental, nonconsensual operations without anesthesia on Anarcha before successfully closing the fistula and tears. During the procedures, Anacha was given no anesthesia, which had recently become available. Following the procedures, Sims administered opium, which was then an accepted method to treat pain. The experimental procedures that Sims performed on Anarcha and other enslaved people revolutionized gynecological surgery; the technique Sims developed became the first ever treatment for vesicovaginal fistulae.

On December 21, 1856, Anacha, age 32, was admitted to Sims' Woman's Hospital in New York, with the notation that she stayed about a month and was discharged in January 1857 as cured. Her enslaver was William Lewis Maury, U.S. Navy, Caroline County, Virginia. The circumstances of her trip to New York are unknown.

A tombstone for an "Annacay", wife of Lorenzo Jackson, was found by chance in King George County, Virginia (adjacent to Caroline County). In the 1870 Census, her name is spelled Anaky Jackson, and on her death record, Ankey. The death date on the Vital Statistics does not match that on her tombstone (1869/70). Filmmaker Carples concludes that all of these are the same Anarcha that Sims treated in Alabama. If she was 32 in 1856, she was born in 1824, and pregnant at 13 when she first was treated by Sims.

Remembrance  
In 2015, author J.C. Hallman became obsessed with finding Anarcha. He published articles about Sims and Anarcha in Harper's Magazine, the Montgomery Advertiser, and The Baffler, and his work to discover Anarcha's final resting place is featured in Josh Carples' documentary film Remembering Anarcha. Hallman is working on a book entitled The Anarcha Quest, based on the first archival evidence of Anarcha's life that did not come from Sims's own accounts.

A small statue of Anarcha Westcott was erected by protestors near the statue of Sims on the grounds of the Alabama State Capitol. It was quickly stolen.

Feminist hardcore punk band War on Women wrote a song called "Anarcha" on their 2018 album "Capture the Flag", honouring Anarcha Westcott. It denounces the actions of Sims and their impact on Anarcha and the other two named women he is known to have experimented on, as well as the more general context of men imposing their will on the bodies of women, as a way of remembering all the other women who suffered similar fates and whose names were ignored and forgotten at the time.

In 2021, artist Michelle Browder toured the country raising funds and asking for donations of discarded metal objects, which she would weld to construct a 15-foot memorial to Anarcha Westcott and two other women (Betsey and Lucy) who were experimented on by Sims. The work, the Mothers of Gynecology Monument, was completed in San Francisco and the sculpture was erected in Montgomery, Alabama, as part of a wider campus project to bring awareness to the Mothers of Gynecology Movement.

Media
 
 
 “Behind the Sheet”, by Charly Evon Simpson, "reframes modern gynecology’s origin story, demonstrating how these women supported one another through suffering, and challenges the dominant historical narrative that centers Sims."
 Outdoor painting of Anarcha, Lucy and Betsey in downtown Montgomery. Artist?
 https://www.pbs.org/newshour/tag/mothers-of-gynecology

Poetry

See also
 List of enslaved people
 List of monuments to African Americans
 Slavery in the United States

References

Further reading
 

19th-century African-American people
19th-century African-American women
History of medicine in the United States
History of human subject research
African-American history in Montgomery, Alabama
Clinical research ethics
19th-century American slaves
Human subject research in the United States
J. Marion Sims